Bhale Mogudu is a 1987 Telugu-language drama film, produced by S.P. Venkanna Babu under the Maheswari Movies banner and directed by Relangi Narasimha Rao. It stars Rajendra Prasad and Rajani,  with music composed by Satyam. This film is the debut of popular TV actress Kinnera. The film was recorded as a Super Hit at the box office.

Plot
The film begins with Rama Krishna working as a sales representative at Dhanalakshmi Agencies Pvt. Ltd. He is the most trustworthy employee of his proprietary Koteswara Rao, one that summits the company with his canny personality. Krishna has a father Shankaram, a mother Parvati, and a younger brother Babji. Moreover, he is the breadwinner as his father & brother are lazy bugs, so, he uses his same wit to lead the family. Seeta, the daughter of Koteswara Rao, is a vainglory woman against traditional customs and dislikes men of falsehood. Once she advertise and conducts an interview for a husband when Krishna challenges with his friends to first-rate in it. But after watching Seeta he truly falls for her without knowing her identity. Here, Krishna concocts before her by falsifying himself as a multi-millionaire with a great paternal background, believing it, Seeta loves him. Right now, Seeta introduces Krishna to her father. Nevertheless, Koteswara Rao happily agrees to the match, in virtue of Krishna's righteousness, and asks him to maintain secrecy until the completion of their marriage. Soon after the wedlock, the truth comes forward when Seeta revolts on her father & Krishna. Thereafter, she moves to her in-law's house where she humiliates Krishna with her deeds. The rest of the story is about how Krishna makes Seeta realize his love & rectitude.

Cast

Rajendra Prasad as Rama Krishna
Rajani as Seeta 
Satyanarayana as Koteswara Rao
Gollapudi Maruti Rao as Shakaram
Subhalekha Sudhakar as Babji
Ranganath as I.G.
Suthi Veerabhadra Rao as Manmadha Rao
Suthi Velu as Gopala Rao
Rallapalli as Simhachalam
Sakshi Ranga Rao
Bheemiswara Rao
Chidatala Appa Rao as Sweet Shop Owner
Mithai Chitti
Tata Appa Rao
Annapurna as Parvathi
Disco Shanti as Lilly
Kinnera as Lakshmi
Maya as Rangamma 
Y. Vijaya as Sundaramma

Soundtrack 

Soundtrack composed by Chellapilla Satyam was released through T-Series music label. Lyrics were written by Aatreya and Sirivennela Seetharama Sastry.

Other
 VCDs and DVDs on - SHALIMAR Video Company, Hyderabad

References

Films scored by Satyam (composer)
1980s Telugu-language films
Films directed by Relangi Narasimha Rao